Kinjačka is a village in central Croatia, in the municipality of Sunja, Sisak-Moslavina County. It is located in the Banija region.

History

Demographics
According to the 2011 census, the village of Kinjačka has 213 inhabitants. This represents 55.61% of its pre-war population.

According to the 1991 census, 90.34% of the village population were ethnic Serbs (346/383), 2.09% were ethnic Croats (8/383), 5.48% were Yugoslavs (21/383), and 2.09% were of other ethnicity (8/383).

Notable natives and residents

References 

Populated places in Sisak-Moslavina County
Serb communities in Croatia